Luponini from Chicago (Spanish:Luponini de Chicago) is a 1935 Mexican comedy crime film directed by and starring José Bohr. It also features Anita Blanch, Carlos Villatoro and Isabelita Blanch.

Cast
 José Bohr as Luponini  
 Anita Blanch as Luisa Benitez  
 Carlos Villatoro as Chato  
 Isabelita Blanch as Isabel 
 Maruja Gómez as Maravilla  
 Raúl Talán as Colibri  
 Manuel Buendía as Dominguez, policia  
 Arturo Manrique as Moreno, policia  
 Jorge Trevino as Montes, policia 
 Paco Martínez as Padre de Luponini  
 Godofredo de Velasco as Juan Orlando  
 Consuelo Segarra as Sra. Benitez

References

Bibliography 
 Daniel Balderston, Mike Gonzalez & Ana M. Lopez. Encyclopedia of Contemporary Latin American and Caribbean Cultures. Routledge, 2002.

External links 
 

1935 films
1930s crime comedy films
Mexican crime comedy films
1930s Spanish-language films
Films directed by José Bohr
Mexican black-and-white films
1935 comedy films
1930s Mexican films